This is the discography for American hip hop recording artist Dorrough.

Studio albums 

 Ride Wit Me (2017)

Mixtapes

Singles

As lead artist

As featured performer

Guest appearances

References 

Discographies of American artists
Hip hop discographies